Charles Shattuck Hill, C.E. (1868after 1909) was an American civil engineer, author and editor, born at Fairfield, Vermont. He received his degree in civil engineering in 1888. He served on the editorial staff of the Engineering News until 1906; then he became editor of Engineering and Contracting.

Works
The Chicago Main Drainage Canal (1896)
Reinforced Concrete (1904)
Concrete Construction (1908)
Concrete Inspection (1909)

External links
 
 

1868 births
Year of death missing
People from Fairfield, Vermont
American male journalists
American non-fiction writers
Writers from Vermont